is the seventh Japanese single released by Korean boy group The Boss. It was scheduled to be released on February 6, 2013 on their Japanese label Sony Music Entertainment.

Single information
The single will be available in three different versions, including two DVD editions and a CD only release. All releases come with the same track list including "Valentine Fighter", "24×7", and "Come Back to Me" as well as the instrumental of its title track. Limited Type A includes a DVD with the music video for "Valentine Fighter" and off shot footage. It comes with a deluxe booklet and will be shipped as a digipack release. Limited Type B will be joined with a special project movie. As with all previous releases, the CD only edition will feature one out of six trading cards.

Track list

CD

Limited edition A DVD

Limited edition B DVD

Charts

Release history

References

External links
 大国男児 | Sony Music 
 The Boss official website 

2013 songs
J-pop songs
2013 singles
Sony Music Entertainment Japan singles